The 2002 Waterford Senior Hurling Championship was the 102nd staging of the Waterford Senior Hurling Championship since its establishment by the Waterford County Board in 1897. The championship began on 26 April 2002 and ended on 10 November 2002.

Ballygunner were the defending champions.

On 6 October 2002, Mount Sion won the championship after a 1-19 to 2-14 defeat of Ballygunner in the final at Walsh Park.  It was their 32nd championship title overall and their first title since 2000.

Ballyduff Lower's James Cuddihy was the championship's top scorer with 2-25.

Results

First round

Second round

Relegation play-off

Losers' group

Quarter-final

Semi-finals

Final

Championship statistics

Top scorers

Top scorers overall

Top scorers in a single game

References

Waterford
Waterford Senior Hurling Championship